The Grizzly Bluff School was an historic school in the farm fields outside Ferndale, California.  Students came from the surrounding Eel River valley to attend a one-room school earlier than the construction of the first known school building.

Tom Dix and John Davenport built the current building in 1871, and the ornamental windbreak was planted in 1878.  In the 1880s, the building was moved away from the road and placed on a new foundation.

In 1900, more space was needed to support a large number of students and the old Presbyterian Church nearby was converted to schoolrooms. By 1976, the school continued only grades one through four.  Students from fifth and attended Ferndale Elementary School.  Grizzly Bluff School closed its doors for the last time on 30 June 30, 1989.

References

Sources

Victorian architecture in California
One-room schoolhouses in California
School buildings on the National Register of Historic Places in California
Schools in Humboldt County, California
Schoolhouses in the United States
School buildings completed in 1871
History of Humboldt County, California
Defunct schools in California
National Register of Historic Places in Humboldt County, California
1871 establishments in California